Cymbiola houarti   is a species of sea snail, a marine gastropod mollusk in the family Volutidae.

References

External links
 Worms Link

Volutidae
Gastropods described in 1998